Diego Sánchez Montoya (born 4 May 1990) is a Spanish footballer who plays for Jumilla CF as a forward.

Club career
Born in Murcia, Sánchez played youth football with local Real Murcia and CA Cabezo de Torres, making his senior debuts in the 2009–10 season with CD Bala Azul in Tercera División. He first arrived in Segunda División B in the 2010 summer, signing with Jumilla CF.

Sánchez spent the following two years in the third level, with Lorca Atlético CF and CF Fuenlabrada. With the latter team, he scored a career-best 13 goals.

On 5 August 2013, Sánchez signed a two-year deal with SD Ponferradina from Segunda División. On 19 September, he appeared in his first game as a professional, playing the last five minutes in a 1–0 away win against AD Alcorcón.

On 12 August 2014, Sánchez terminated his contract with Ponfe, joining Lleida Esportiu for two seasons hours later.

References

External links

1990 births
Living people
Spanish footballers
Footballers from Murcia
Association football forwards
Segunda División players
Segunda División B players
Tercera División players
CF Rayo Majadahonda players
CF Fuenlabrada footballers
SD Ponferradina players
Lleida Esportiu footballers
UE Olot players
Lorca Atlético CF players